Carmen Osbahr-Vertiz (born April 21, 1962) is a Mexican-born American puppeteer, singer and voice actress who has performed Rosita in the popular hit children's series Sesame Street, since 1991. Osbahr has also performed Kiki Flores in The Puzzle Place and Lily in Johnny and the Sprites.

From September 8–10, 2017, she was an additional Muppet performer for a live show at the Hollywood Bowl titled The Muppets Take the Bowl, and the following year, she performed in London for The Muppets Take the O2.

Filmography
 Billy Bunny's Animal Songs – Gopher
 The Muppets Celebrate Jim Henson – Additional Muppets
 Sesame Street – Rosita, Additional Muppets
 Hispanic America: Sésamo - Rosita
 The Puzzle Place – Kiki Flores, Orange Piece Police
 Between the Lions – Sierra Lion
 Bear in the Big Blue House – Ursa (voice only)
 Johnny and the Sprites – Lily

External links
 

1962 births
20th-century American actresses
21st-century American actresses
20th-century Mexican actresses
21st-century Mexican actresses
American television actresses
American voice actresses
Living people
Mexican emigrants to the United States
Mexican television actresses
Mexican voice actresses
Sesame Street Muppeteers
Muppet performers